Baroncelli may refer to:

People with the surname
Folco de Baroncelli-Javon (1869–1943), French author and cattle farmer.
Jacques de Baroncelli (1881–1951), French film director. 
Jean de Baroncelli (1914-1998), French author.

Locations
Baroncelli Chapel, a chapel inside the Basilica of Santa Croce, Florence in Florence, Italy.

Paintings
Master of the Baroncelli Portraits